AMC-7 is a commercial broadcast communications satellite owned by SES S.A., originally from the GE Americom fleet. Launched on 14 September 2000, at 22:54:07 UTC from the Centre Spatial Guyanais in Kourou, AMC-7 provides C-band coverage to United States, Caribbean, Mexico, and is located in a geostationary orbit over the Pacific Ocean east of Hawaii. The satellite is primarily used for cable television programming distribution.

In 2015, the satellite was taken out of commercial service and moved from 137° West to 135° West longitude, where it now serves as a backup to AMC-10. License extended till 25 October 2018.

References

External links 
 AMC-7 website
 
 

Communications satellites in geostationary orbit
Satellite television
Spacecraft launched in 2000
SES satellites
AMC-07